Booji may refer to:

 Booji Boy, a character by New Wave band Devo.
 Booji Boys